Lorenzo Libutti (born 17 September 1997) is an Italian football player. He plays for  club Reggiana.

Club career
He played for the first 6 seasons of his senior career in the lower-tier Serie C and Serie D.

He made his Serie B debut for Reggiana on 20 October 2020 in a game against Ascoli, as a starter.

References

External links
 

1997 births
People from Melfi
Sportspeople from the Province of Potenza
Living people
Italian footballers
Association football defenders
A.S. Melfi players
F.C. Grosseto S.S.D. players
U.S. Triestina Calcio 1918 players
A.C. Reggiana 1919 players
Serie B players
Serie C players
Serie D players
Footballers from Basilicata